The 107th United States Congress began on January 3, 2001. There were eleven new senators (nine Democrats, two Republicans) and 41 representatives (28 Republicans, 13 Democrats), as well as one new delegate (a Democrat) at the start of the first session. Additionally, four senators (three Republicans, one third party member) and nine representatives (three Democrats, six Republicans) took office on various dates in order to fill vacancies during the 107th Congress before it ended on January 3, 2003.

Senate

Took office January 3, 2001

Took office during the 107th Congress

House of Representatives

Took office January 3, 2001

Non-voting members

Took office during the 107th Congress

See also 
List of United States senators in the 107th Congress
List of members of the United States House of Representatives in the 107th Congress by seniority

Notes 

107th United States Congress
107